The 1968 Men's National Tennis League (NTL)  was the inaugural series of professional tennis tournaments founded by George McCall, among others: Rod Laver, Roy Emerson, Ken Rosewall, Andrés Gimeno, Pancho Gonzales and Fred Stolle.

History
In 1967 two new professional tennis organizations were formed: the National Tennis League, organized by former U.S. Davis Cup captain George MacCall, and World Championship Tennis (WCT), which was founded by New Orleans promoter Dave Dixon and funded by Dallas oil and football tycoon Lamar Hunt. At the time the two professional tours signed a significant number of the world’s top players, professional and amateur.

In 1968 the first NTL Tour began in March with the opening tournament held in Sao Paulo, Brazil that was won by Rod Laver and ended with the final tournament held in Lima, Peru in November that was won by Fred Stolle.

Legend

Calendar
This is the complete schedule of events on the 1968 National Tennis League, with player progression partially documented until the quarterfinals stage.

January
No events

February
No events

March

April

May

June 
No events

July

August

September
No events

October
No events

November

December
No events

References

Sources

 Robertson, Max (1974). Encyclopaedia of Tennis. Allen & Unwin. .

External links

National Tennis League
1968 Men's National Tennis League